John Henry Jonsson (12 May 1912 – 9 March 2001) was a Swedish runner who won a bronze medal over 5000 m at the 1936 Summer Olympics. He finished second at the 1938 European Championships. In 1940 he changed his name to Henry Kälarne, and was awarded the Svenska Dagbladet Gold Medal that same year.

Jonsson worked as a firefighter in Stockholm. During his career he won 11 national titles: in the 1500 m (1936 and 1940), 5000 m (1935 and 1937–39) and 8000 m cross country (1935–39). In 1946 he was disqualified for violating amateur rules, together with Gunder Hägg and Arne Andersson.

References

1912 births
2001 deaths
People from Bräcke Municipality
Swedish male long-distance runners
Athletes (track and field) at the 1936 Summer Olympics
Olympic athletes of Sweden
Olympic bronze medalists for Sweden
European Athletics Championships medalists
Medalists at the 1936 Summer Olympics
Olympic bronze medalists in athletics (track and field)
Sportspeople from Jämtland County